Sultanuvaisia is an extinct genus of ichthyodectiform teleost ray-finned fish from the Late Cretaceous of Kyzyl Kum, central Asia.  It was named by Lev Nesov in 1981.  At first, he tentatively described the fossil material as jaw fragments of a ctenochasmatid pterosaur (a flying reptile), but reinterpreted Sultanuvaisia as a fish in 1986.  The type species is S. antiqua.

References

External links
The Pterosaur Species List, 3rd Edition (pdf). Compiled by Michael Hanson.

Prehistoric bony fish genera
Cretaceous bony fish
Late Cretaceous fish of Asia
Ichthyodectiformes
Fossil taxa described in 1981